Julia Simon (born 9 October 1996) is a French biathlete. She competes in the Biathlon World Cup.

Biathlon results
All results are sourced from the International Biathlon Union.

Olympic Games
1 medal (1 silver)

World Championships
4 medals (2 gold, 2 bronze)

World Cup
World Cup rankings

Individual victories
8 victories (1 Sp, 4 Pu, 3 MS)

Relay victories
9 victories

*Results are from IBU races which include the Biathlon World Cup, Biathlon World Championships and the Winter Olympic Games.

References

External links

1996 births
Living people
French female biathletes
Sportspeople from Albertville
Biathlon World Championships medalists
Biathletes at the 2022 Winter Olympics
Medalists at the 2022 Winter Olympics
Olympic biathletes of France
Olympic silver medalists for France
Olympic medalists in biathlon
21st-century French women